Abdol Robababad (also Romanized as ‘Abdol Robābābād and ‘Abd or Robābābād) is a village in Zeynabad Rural District, Shal District, Buin Zahra County, Qazvin Province, Iran. At the 2006 census, its population was 144, in 27 families.

References 

Populated places in Buin Zahra County